Money to Burn may refer to:

Film and television
Money to Burn (1911 film), directed by Edwin S. Porter
Money to Burn (1922 film), directed by Rowland V. Lee
Money to Burn (1926 film), directed by Walter Lang
Money to Burn (1939 film), directed by Gus Meins
Money to Burn (1973 film), TV film starring E. G. Marshall
Money to Burn (1983 film), directed by Virginia L. Stone
Money to Burn (2010 film), starring David Carradine
"Money to Burn" (Randall and Hopkirk (Deceased)), an episode of the 1969 British television series Randall and Hopkirk (Deceased)
"Money to Burn", 1988 episode of British sitcom 'Allo 'Allo! (series 5)

Music
"Money to Burn" (Richard Ashcroft song), 2000
Money to Burn (album), 2006 rap album by C-Bo
Money to Burn (musical), 2003 musical by Daniel Abineri
"Money to Burn" (George Jones song), 1959